Siuslaw may refer to:

Siuslaw people, Native American tribe and the Siuslaw language they spoke
Siuslaw River, a river named for the tribe
Siuslaw River Bridge, a bridge named for the river it spans
Siuslaw National Forest, a forest named for the river